Phillip Kingston (born August 7, 1985) is a British-Australian entrepreneur and engineer. He founded Sargon and GrowthOps.

Career

Sargon
Kingston founded Sargon, a financial technology and superannuation services firm, with Aron D'Souza in 2013.

In 2019, Sargon sought to float itself on the Australian Stock Exchange, with it being reported that backers hoped it would be valued at over AUS$1 billion.

Sargon went into administration in February 2020, after creditors appointed receivers to try to recover unpaid debts from the firm. Creditors included GrowthOps, another of Kingston's businesses, which was owed "an amount below $1.8 million" and told investors it was unsure whether the money was recoverable. Sargon's lender, Taiping Trustees, sought to freeze Kingston's assets in September 2020 but was blocked by a court order.

In August 2021, it was reported that documents tabled to Parliament by Liberal MP Tim Wilson showed that the parent company of Taiping Trustees had misdirected repayments in "a deliberate effort to take ownership" of Sargon.

GrowthOps
Kingston originally founded Trimantium, a digital services provider, in 2008. It became GrowthOps in 2017 after merging with nine IT firms. It floated on the Australian Stock Exchange in 2018, being valued at $64m. It posted losses of $13.6m in 2018 and over $65m in 2019, but cut this to a $24m loss in 2020 after restructuring. The firm delisted itself in October 2020.

Other activities
Kingston has been a board member of the Victoria State Government’s LaunchVic initiative to build the state’s entrepreneurial and startup ecosystem, and is the author of The War for Eyeballs: An Introduction to Internet Marketing (2010).

References 

Australian businesspeople
1985 births
Living people